She Cried No (also known as Freshman Fall) is a 1996 American made-for-television drama film directed by Bethany Rooney and starring Candace Cameron Bure and Mark-Paul Gosselaar, both teen idols at the time.

Plot
Melissa Connell (Candace Cameron Bure) is a college freshman who is anxious to fit in with the popular crowd. After arriving, she is invited to a party by a guy, Scott Baker (Mark-Paul Gosselaar), with her roommates Jordan McCann (Jenna Von Oy) and Kellie Salter (Nikki Cox), and attracts the attention of Scott, the member of the college's most popular fraternity (to which her brother, Michael Connell (Brandon Douglas), also belongs) who has a history of date-raping fellow female students. She and Jordan attend a party at Scott's frat; there, she becomes the latest victim of Scott, who drugs her. Before he takes her upstairs to a room to rape her, she notices a passed-out Jordan being taken to a room by a guy as well. Upstairs, Scott turns on loud music, and then rapes her. Melissa manages to escape his room afterwards and flees from the frat house in tears.

The next day, an upset Melissa returns to college and bumps several times into Scott, who pretends as if nothing has happened. Melissa becomes depressed, ignoring her school work, estranging from her friends, not eating and not sleeping. Jordan takes it worse and drops out of college immediately. One night, while having dinner with Michael and his girlfriend Holly Essex (Hillary Danner), Scott shows up. Melissa freaks out, runs away and causes a car accident. She is taken into the hospital, but is not severely injured. She admits to a doctor about what happened, and she realizes she had been raped. She later admits this to her mother Denise Connell (Bess Armstrong), who wants to press charges. Michael and her father Edward (Lawrence Pressman) discourage her from doing this, explaining it could ruin her future.

Prosecuting Scott proves to be difficult, because she does not have any evidence. She receives no support from her friends and fellow students either, who think she led him on and was asking for it. When Scott starts to threaten her and students start bullying her, she considers pulling back from prosecuting. However, fed up with being scared, she decides not to give up, but Scott manipulates the jury and is found not guilty. Devastated by the results, Melissa attempts to move on with her life, wanting to put the rape behind her. Michael, however, is determined to help her and finds photos taken the night of the party (as she is fleeing from the room) proving Melissa was right all along. He gets into a fight with Scott for raping his sister and announces he is leaving the fraternity.

Meanwhile, Melissa starts receiving support from other students. Courtney (Jennifer Greenhut), a promiscuous girl, admits to her that she was raped by Scott as well but did not have the courage to say something. At Michael's going away party, Scott and the rest of his fraternity brothers force him to drink excessively (possibly as retribution for sticking up for Melissa), causing him to severely black out and be hospitalized, though he survives. This inspires Melissa to fight back so she starts to collect evidence against Scott and is successful in gaining much video footage, that was taken the night of the party and various other times in the frat house that shows his true nature, from Leland (Kristoffer Ryan Winters) (Michael's best friend, the frat camera man, who is also considering leaving the fraternity after Michael's hospitalization). She gives Scott one chance to come clean, and when he does not take it, she publicizes the footage by airing it on TV, showing what kind of person he truly is. Afterwards, Scott becomes alienated, Kellie apologizes to Melissa for not being there for her, and Jordan finally shares her rape story with Melissa before telling her that she plans to reapply for the next semester.

As the film ends, Scott's fraternity house is being shut down, apparently, the fraternity's charter having been revoked for the consumption of alcohol on their premises.

Cast
 Candace Cameron Bure as Melissa Connell
 Mark-Paul Gosselaar as Scott Baker
 Lawrence Pressman as Edward Connell
 Bess Armstrong as Denise Connell
 Jenna von Oÿ as Jordan McCann
 Brandon Douglas as Michael Connell
 Nikki Cox as Kellie Salter
 Ray Baker as Mark Baker
Hillary Danner as Holly Essex
Kristoffer Ryan Winters as Leland
Jennifer Greenhut as Courtney

References

External links
 
 Freshman Fall at The Movie Scene

1996 television films
1996 films
1996 crime drama films
American crime drama films
Films about fraternities and sororities
NBC network original films
Films about rape
Films directed by Bethany Rooney
1990s English-language films
1990s American films